These are the Official UK Charts Company's Official Indie Chart number one hits of 2002.

See also
2002 in music

References

2002 record charts
Indie 2002
2002 in British music